The Arab world consists of 22 countries located in Western Asia, Northern Africa, the Maghreb, the Horn of Africa, and the Indian Ocean. It covers a combined area of 13 million km2. It extends from Morocco in the west, southward to the Comoros, eastward to Somalia, and northward to Iraq.

Geography of each country
The geography of each country:

Regions
Terrains in the area can be divided into three main types: the large arid desert covering most of it, the fertile south and north, and finally the high mountains of the Atlas, Ahaggar, Zagros and the Anti-Lebanon Mountains, along with the Hijaz Mountain range.

The Arab world can also be divided into two continental parts: Asian, which has 12 states, and African, which is larger and has 10 states. Adjacent to the Arab world are 14 land neighbours and 4 sea neighbours. Geographically, the Arab world countries are further subdivided into four regions:

The Arab world has a high population density, with an estimated 350 million inhabitants. Culturally, the Arab states can be divided into 3 regions:
The Greater Maghreb, which includes Morocco, Mauritania, Algeria, Tunisia and Libya.
The Fertile Crescent, which includes Lebanon, Syria, Palestine, Egypt, Iraq and Jordan.
The Arabian Peninsula, which includes Saudi Arabia, UAE, Qatar, Oman, Bahrain, Kuwait and Yemen.

Landscape

Most of the Arab world falls in the driest region of the world. Almost 80% of it is covered in desert (10,666,637 of 13,333,296 km2), stretching from Mauritania and Morocco to Oman and the UAE. The second most common terrain is the semi-arid terrain, which found in all Arab countries except Lebanon and Comoros.

Several deserts span the Arab world:

The highest point in the Arab world is in Morocco called Jbel Toubkal, standing 4,165m tall, making it the 40th highest place on earth, and 6th in Africa, next comes Jabal an Nabi Shu'ayb (at 3,666 m) in Yemen and Cheekha Dar (at 3,611 m) in Iraq.

The lowest point in the Arab world is the Dead sea between Jordan and Palestine.

Climate
The hottest temperature recorded in the Arab world took place in Kuwait from Mid-July to Mid-August 2022, reaching  in Kuwait City, breaking a record set in 1987.

See also
Geography of the Horn of Africa
Geography of North Africa
Geography of West Asia

References